Jonas Fredrik Björler (born 26 February 1973) is a Swedish musician and the bass player of the melodic death metal bands At the Gates and The Haunted. He was formerly in the bands Demolition, Infestation and Terror.

Discography

Demolition 
 Hordes of Evil (demo) (1987)

Infestation 
 When Sanity Ends (demo) (1990)

At the Gates 
Björler was the original drummer of the band due to being the drummer of the previous band Infestation, but it was soon discovered that he wasn't able to drum for the band and became their bassist instead. Along with Tomas Lindberg and Adrian Erlandsson, he is one of the original members left in the band.

 Gardens of Grief (EP) (1991)
 The Red in the Sky Is Ours (1992)
 With Fear I Kiss the Burning Darkness (1993)
 Terminal Spirit Disease (1994)
 Slaughter of the Soul (1995)
 Suicidal Final Art (compilation) (2001)
 At War with Reality (2014)
 To Drink from the Night Itself (2018)
 The Nightmare of Being (2021)

Terror 
 Demo '94 (1994)

The Haunted 
Formed after the split-up of At the Gates in 1996. Björler is a founding member together with Patrik Jensen and Adrian Erlandsson.

 Demo '97 (1997)
 The Haunted (1998)
 The Haunted Made Me Do It (2000)
 Live Rounds in Tokyo (2001)
 Caught on Tape (2002) DVD
 One Kill Wonder (2003)
 Revolver (2004)
 The Dead Eye (2006)
 Versus (2008)
 Unseen (2011)
 Exit Wounds (2014)
 Strength in Numbers'' (2017)

References

External links 
The Haunted homepage
At the Gates homepage

Swedish heavy metal bass guitarists
The Haunted (Swedish band) members
1973 births
Living people
At the Gates members
21st-century bass guitarists